The rhyme-as-reason effect, or Eaton–Rosen phenomenon, is a cognitive bias whereupon a saying or aphorism is judged as more accurate or truthful when it is rewritten to rhyme.

In experiments, subjects judged variations of sayings which did and did not rhyme, and tended to evaluate those that rhymed as more truthful (controlled for meaning). For example, the saying "What sobriety conceals, alcohol reveals" was judged more accurate on average than: "What sobriety conceals, alcohol unmasks", sampling across separate groups of subjects (who each assessed the accuracy of only one of these statements).

The effect could be caused by the Keats heuristic, according to which a statement's truth is evaluated according to aesthetic qualities; or the fluency heuristic, according to which things could be preferred due their ease of cognitive processing.

References

Cognitive biases